This is a list of public art on permanent public display in Belfast, Northern Ireland. The list applies only to works of public art accessible in a public space; it does not include artwork on display inside museums. Public art may include sculptures, statues, monuments, memorials, murals and mosaics. The murals of Belfast are discussed separately in Murals in Northern Ireland.

City centre

Belfast City Hall

South Belfast
South Belfast is defined as the area of the city south of the railway line from the A12 (Westlink) to the River Lagan. It includes Queen's University Belfast, the Ulster Museum and the Botanic Gardens.

The Queen's University of Belfast

East Belfast
East Belfast is defined as the city east of the River Lagan. It includes the Titanic Quarter and the Stormont Estate.

West Belfast
West Belfast is defined as the area of the city west of the A12 (westlink) and south of the Crumlin Road. It includes the Falls Road and the Shankill Road. West Belfast is famous for its murals, both Loyalist and Republican. These are discussed separately in the article Murals in Northern Ireland.

See also
List of public art in Dublin
List of public art in Cork City
List of public art in Limerick
List of public art in Galway city

References

Monuments and memorials in Northern Ireland
Culture in Belfast
Buildings and structures in County Antrim
Listed monuments and memorials in Northern Ireland
Belfast
Northern Ireland-related lists
Belfast